John W. Colloton (born 1931 in Mason City, Iowa) was the Director and CEO for the University of Iowa Hospitals and Clinics from 1971 to 1993.  He assumed the title of director emeritus in 2001.  He had a great influence in developing the University of Iowa's hospital program.  Colloton is the recipient of the Horatio Alger Award for Distinguished Americans.

His son, Steven Colloton, sits as a judge on United States Court of Appeals for the Eighth Circuit. He was nominated by President George W. Bush in 2003.

External links
Colloton's Horatio Alger Association page

1931 births
Living people
People from Mason City, Iowa
Members of the National Academy of Medicine